Abuja attack may refer to:

Abuja bus crash riots
Miss World riots
October 2010 Abuja bombings
December 2010 Abuja bombing
May 2011 Nigeria bombings
2011 Abuja police headquarters bombing
2011 Abuja United Nations bombing
Abuja DSS attack
April 2014 Nyanya bombing
May 2014 Nyanya bombing
June 2014 Kaduna and Abuja attacks
Wuse bombing